The Department of Justice and Constitutional Development is the justice department of the South African government. The department provides administrative and financial support to the court system and the judiciary (which are constitutionally independent of the executive), oversees the National Prosecuting Authority, provides legal advice and representation to organs of state, and facilitates law reform.

The political head of the department is the Minister of Justice and Correctional Services, who is supported by a Deputy Minister of Justice.  the minister is Ronald Lamola and the deputy minister is John Jeffery.

In the 2020 budget, R22,410.8 million was appropriated for the Department of Justice and Constitutional Development, and a further R2,450.8 million for the Office of the Chief Justice and Judicial Administration. In the 2018/19 financial year the department had 22,050 employees, with a further 2,415 employees in the Office of the Chief Justice.

References

External links
 

Justice and Constitutional Development
South Africa
Legal organisations based in South Africa